Fanapanges is an island in the Nomwisofo Area belonging to the Faichuk Region and municipality in the state of Chuuk, Federated States of Micronesia.  Fanapanges is one of the least populated island (behind Eot) in the whole Chuuk State Regions.

References
Statoids.com, retrieved December 8, 2010

Municipalities of Chuuk State